Raffinose is a trisaccharide composed of galactose, glucose, and fructose. It can be found in beans, cabbage, brussels sprouts, broccoli, asparagus, other vegetables, and whole grains. Raffinose can be hydrolyzed to D-galactose and sucrose by the enzyme α-galactosidase (α-GAL), an enzyme which in the lumen of the human digestive tract is only produced by bacteria in the large intestine. α-GAL also hydrolyzes other α-galactosides such as stachyose, verbascose, and galactinol, if present. The enzyme does not cleave β-linked galactose, as in lactose.

Chemical properties 
The raffinose family of oligosaccharides (RFOs) are alpha-galactosyl derivatives of sucrose, and the most common are the trisaccharide raffinose, the tetrasaccharide stachyose, and the pentasaccharide verbascose. RFOs are almost ubiquitous in the plant kingdom, being found in a large variety of seeds from many different families, and they rank second only to sucrose in abundance as soluble carbohydrates.

Raffinose typically crystallises as a pentahydrate white crystalline powder. It is odorless and has a sweet taste approximately 10% that of sucrose.

Biochemical properties

Energy source 
It is non-digestible in humans and other monogastric animals (pigs and poultry) who do not possess the α-GAL enzyme to break down RFOs. These oligosaccharides pass undigested through the stomach and small intestine. In the large intestine, they are fermented by bacteria that do possess the α-GAL enzyme and make short-chain fatty acids (SCFA)(acetic, propionic, butyric acids), as well as the flatulence commonly associated with eating beans and other vegetables. These SCFAs have been recently found to impart a number of health benefits. α-GAL is present in digestive aids such as the product Beano.

Disease relevance 
Research has shown that the differential ability to utilize raffinose by strains of the bacteria Streptococcus pneumoniae, impacts their ability to cause disease and the nature of the disease.

Uses 
Procedures concerning cryopreservation have used raffinose to provide hypertonicity for cell desiccation prior to freezing. Either raffinose or sucrose is used as a base substance for sucralose.

Raffinose is also used in:

 skin moisturizers and smoothers
 prebiotics (it promotes growth of lactobacilli and bifidobacteria)
 food or drinks additive

See also
 Raffinose—raffinose alpha-galactosyltransferase
 Raphanin

Further reading 

 D(+)-Raffinose pentahydrate, Chemical Books

References

Trisaccharides